"Love My Way" is a song by English band The Psychedelic Furs. It was released in July 1982 as the first single from their third studio album Forever Now. Written by the four members of the group and produced by Todd Rundgren, who also played marimba on the song, the song reached the top 10 of the charts in New Zealand, top 30 in Australia and the top 50 in the United Kingdom and United States.

Lyrics
Front man of the group Richard Butler had a specific audience in mind when he penned the lyrics to this song. He explained this in an interview with Creem in 1983: "It's basically addressed to people who are fucked up about their sexuality, and says 'Don't worry about it.' It was originally written for gay people."

Release and reception
Released in 1982, "Love My Way" peaked at number nine in New Zealand, where it spent 21 weeks on the chart. 
The song peaked at number 42 in the UK 
and number 44 on the U.S. Billboard Hot 100. 
It also reached number 30 on the U.S. Mainstream Rock chart and number 40 on the Dance Music/Club Play Singles chart.

British filmmaker Tim Pope directed the official music video for "Love My Way" in 1982, and it was placed in regular rotation on MTV.

The single was released in the UK with the non-album B-side, "Aeroplane." In the US, the B-side was changed to a different non-album track, "I Don't Want to Be Your Shadow". Both songs are included on the 2002 reissue of Forever Now.

Usage in media
The song is featured in the 1983 film Valley Girl and appears on the soundtracks of the 1998 film The Wedding Singer, the 2006 film Starter for 10, the 2017 film Call Me by Your Name (where its appearance inspired a major surge in streaming popularity) and the 2002 video game Grand Theft Auto: Vice City on the fiction in-game new wave radio station "Wave 103". 
The song is also downloadable content for the Rock Band series of music video games.

Track listing
7" vinyl
"Love My Way" – 3:30
"Aeroplane" – 3:22

12" vinyl
"Love My Way" – 3:33  	
"Goodbye" (dance mix) – 5:45 	
"Aeroplane" (dance mix) – 5:22

Chart performance

References

1982 singles
The Psychedelic Furs songs
Song recordings produced by Todd Rundgren
1982 songs
Columbia Records singles
Songs written by Tim Butler
Songs written by John Ashton (musician)
Songs written by Richard Butler (singer)
LGBT-related songs